Newgulf (or New Gulf) is an unincorporated community  in Wharton County, Texas, United States. Newgulf, founded as a company town for Texas Gulf Sulfur Company, once boasted a population of over 1,500, but today is little more than a ghost town. Some downtown buildings remain as well as a few company houses, the country club clubhouse, and the massive twin smokestacks and building shell from the sulphur mine, which provide a glimpse of the town's history. Newgulf's functioning elementary school is part of the Boling Independent School District.

References

External links
Newgulf, Texas
HAIF's page on Newgulf
Newgulf: From Sulfur Boomtown to Texas Ghost Town. Southern Methodist University Digital Collections

Unincorporated communities in Texas
Unincorporated communities in Wharton County, Texas
Company towns in Texas